Ondrej Nepela (22 January 1951 – 2 February 1989) was a Slovak figure skater who represented Czechoslovakia. He was the 1972 Olympic champion, a three-time World champion (1971–73), and a five-time European champion (1969–73). Later in his career, he performed professionally and became a coach.

Early life 
Nepela was born on 22 January 1951 in Bratislava, Czechoslovakia. His mother, a housewife and seamstress, and father, a chauffeur, were from central Slovakia.

Career 
Nepela became interested in skating after watching the 1958 European Championships on television — Karol Divín won the men's title for Czechoslovakia. In February 1958, his mother brought the seven-year-old to a Bratislava ice rink. After two weeks, she approached Hilda Múdra to complain that her son was being ignored by the instructors and Múdra agreed to teach him. She described him as a diligent and punctual student. Nepela trained at the Slovan Bratislava club.

Competitive career 
At age 13, Nepela was assigned to his first major international event — the 1964 Winter Olympics. After placing 22nd in Innsbruck, Austria, he debuted at the World Championships and finished 17th.

In the 1965–66 season, Nepela stepped onto his first ISU Championship podium, winning the bronze medal at the 1966 European Championships in Bratislava. He then reached the top ten at the 1966 World Championships in Davos, Switzerland. Over the next two seasons, Nepela won two more European bronze medals and placed eighth at his second Olympics, in Grenoble, France.

In the 1968–69 season, he won gold at the 1969 European Championships in Garmisch-Partenkirchen, West Germany, and stood on his first World podium as the silver medalist at the 1969 World Championships in Colorado Springs, Colorado. The following year, he defended his European title at the 1970 European Championships in Leningrad, Soviet Union, before winning another silver medal at the 1970 World Championships, held in Ljubljana, Yugoslavia.

In 1971, Nepela won his third European title in Zurich, Switzerland and then captured his first World title at the 1971 World Championships in Lyon, France. After becoming the European champion for the fourth consecutive year in Gothenburg (Sweden), Nepela traveled to Sapporo, Japan to compete at his third Olympics. Placing first in the compulsory figures and fourth in the free skate, he finished first overall ahead of the Soviet Union's Sergei Chetverukhin and won the gold medal at the 1972 Winter Olympics, became one of the youngest male figure skating Olympic champions.

Nepela wanted to retire from competition after the 1971–72 season, but agreed to continue one more year because the 1973 World Championships were to be held in Bratislava. After winning his third World title in his hometown, he ended his amateur career. Múdra was his coach throughout his career.

Professional career, coaching, and awards 
From 1973 to 1986, Nepela toured as a soloist with Holiday on Ice. He then established himself as a coach in Germany, coaching Claudia Leistner to her European title in 1989.

In 1972, Nepela was awarded the title of Merited Master of Sport of the USSR. Since 1993, the Slovak Figure Skating Association has held a competition each autumn called the Ondrej Nepela Memorial. In December 2000, the Slovak Republic named him Slovak athlete of the 20th century. Múdra accepted the award on his behalf.

Later years and personal life 
In 1988, Nepela began to develop health problems and had two teeth removed. He died in Mannheim in February 1989, at the age of 38. The medical report from Mannheim hospital named cancer of the lymph nodes as the cause of death.

Results

References

External links 

 
 
 
 Ondrej Nepela Memorial
 Skatabase

1951 births
1989 deaths
Czechoslovak male single skaters
Figure skaters at the 1964 Winter Olympics
Figure skaters at the 1968 Winter Olympics
Figure skaters at the 1972 Winter Olympics
Slovak LGBT sportspeople
Slovak LGBT people
Czechoslovak LGBT people
AIDS-related deaths in Germany
Deaths from cancer in Germany
Olympic figure skaters of Czechoslovakia
Olympic gold medalists for Czechoslovakia
Olympic medalists in figure skating
Figure skaters from Bratislava
Slovak figure skating coaches
Slovak male single skaters
Slovak expatriate sportspeople in Germany
Gay sportsmen
LGBT figure skaters
World Figure Skating Championships medalists
European Figure Skating Championships medalists
Honoured Masters of Sport of the USSR
Medalists at the 1972 Winter Olympics
Universiade medalists in figure skating
Universiade gold medalists for Czechoslovakia
Competitors at the 1970 Winter Universiade
20th-century LGBT people